Mareo Ishiketa  (石桁真礼生, 26 November 1916 in Wakayama – 22 August 1996) was a Japanese composer. Ishiketa was taught composition by Kan'ichi Shimofusa, and graduated in 1939 from the Tokyo School of Music.

Works, editions and recordings
 Furusato no (In my homeland) - recording by Kazumichi Ohno (tenor), Kyosuke Kobayashi (piano). Thorofon CD.

References

External links

1916 births
1996 deaths
20th-century Japanese composers